Pahares I (160–230 CE) was an Indo-Parthian ruler of Turan. Pahares ruled the newly established Kingdom of Turan, following the partition of the remains of the Indo-Parthian kingdom into the realms of Sakastan and Turan. The kingdom of Turan covers the period from 160 to 230 CE. The kingdom of Sakastan was ruled by a second king with the name Sanabares (160-175 CE). 

Pahares succeeded the last of the major Indo-Parthian kings, Sanabares, in 160 CE.
 
In his coinage, he wears a Parthian-style tiara, a close-fitting headress in the style introduced by Sanabares, and the reverse has a figure of Nike walking.

The Kingdoms of Turan and Sakastan ended when they submitted to the Sasanian ruler Ardeshir I circa 230 CE. These events were recorded by Al-Tabari, describing the arrival of envoys to Ardeshir at Gor:

References

Indo-Parthian kings
3rd-century monarchs in Asia
3rd-century Iranian people